South Korea, as Republic of Korea, competed at the 1998 Winter Olympics in Nagano, Japan.

Medalists

Alpine skiing

Men

Biathlon

Men

Cross-country skiing

Men

Figure skating

Men

Luge

Men

Short track speed skating

Men

Women

Ski jumping

Men

Speed skating

Men

Women

References
Official Olympic Reports
International Olympic Committee results database

Korea, South
1998
Winter Olympics